A graduate student journal is an academic journal which is run by graduate students. They are involved in the production, editing and peer review processes for the journal. On the whole, graduate student journals have a poor reputation, and limited funding and training can result in poor production values and editorial practices. Despite this, some graduate student journals, such as the Harvard Educational Review, are highly regarded, and peer review can be performed to a higher standard in student-run journals than in more mainstream journals.

References

Student magazines